The 2018 Virginia Tech Hokies football team represents Virginia Tech during the 2018 NCAA Division I FBS football season. The Hokies are led by third-year head coach Justin Fuente and play their home games at Lane Stadium in Blacksburg, Virginia as members of the Coastal Division of the Atlantic Coast Conference (ACC). Virginia Tech finished the season with a losing record, the first season since the 1991 and 1992 football seasons when Virginia Tech experienced two such seasons back to back.

Previous season
The Hokies finished the 2017 season 9–4, 5–3 in ACC play to finish in second place in the Coastal Division. The Hokies received an invitation to the Camping World Bowl, marking the school's 25th consecutive bowl bid, the longest active bowl streak that is recognized by the NCAA. There they lost to Oklahoma State 30–21.

Preseason

Award watch lists

ACC media poll
The ACC media poll was released on July 24, 2018.

Schedule

Coaching staff

Game summaries

at Florida State

William & Mary

at Old Dominion

at Duke

Notre Dame

at North Carolina

Georgia Tech

Georgia Tech scored 7 touchdowns on the night, which is the most in Lane Stadium since the 1970s. They accomplished this feat 100% on the ground, racking up over 460 yards without completing a single pass. This game also marked the second straight time the backup QB for GT got the start on the road in the GT-VT series. GT is now 4-1 against the Hokies over the last 5 years.

Boston College

at Pittsburgh

Miami (FL)

Virginia

Marshall

vs. Cincinnati (Military Bowl)

Honorary #25 Beamer Jersey 
Since the start of the 2016 season, during the week before each game, Head Coach Justin Fuente selects an outstanding player to wear the #25 jersey in honor of former head coach, Frank Beamer, who wore #25 as a player for Virginia Tech. The jersey represents hard work, toughness, good sportsmanship and being a exemplary teammate. At first, the distinction was intended strictly for special teams players, but has since been expanded to include all team members.

The players honored in the 2018 season are:

Rankings

References

External links

Virginia Tech
Virginia Tech Hokies football seasons
Virginia Tech Hokies football